The 50th Alabama Infantry Regiment was an infantry regiment of the Confederate States Army during the American Civil War. The regiment was originally named 26th Alabama (Coltart's), but was renamed 50th Alabama on June 6, 1863.

It is not to be confused with another 26th Alabama (O'Neill's) which was formed around the same time and served with the Army of Northern Virginia and later Army of Tennessee.

Organization and muster
The 26th Alabama (Coltart's) was formed on April 3, 1862 at Corinth, Mississippi by consolidating the 2nd and 5th Alabama Infantry Battalions. It was consolidated with the 39th Alabama during the first half of 1863; this was on the field and not officially confirmed. 

The regiment was redesignated as the 50th Alabama Infantry Regiment on June 6, 1863 to avoid confusion with the other 26th Alabama. 

The regiment was consolidated with the 22nd, 25th and 39th Alabama Infantry on April 9, 1865 to form the 22nd Alabama Infantry Regiment (Consolidated). The latter surrendered at Greensboro, North Carolina on April 26, 1865.

History

See also
List of Alabama Civil War Confederate units

Notes

References
 U.S. War Department, The War of the Rebellion: a Compilation of the Official Records of the Union and Confederate Armies, U.S. Government Printing Office, 1880–1901.
 Stewart Sifakis. Compendium of the Confederate Armies: Alabama. Facts on File, NY 1992 

Units and formations of the Confederate States Army from Alabama
1862 establishments in Alabama
Military units and formations established in 1862
Military units and formations disestablished in 1865